GRB Entertainment, Inc. (doing business as GRB Studios since October 9, 2018) is an American film and television production company and distributor, known for producing and distributing reality and documentary programs such as Intervention and Untold Stories of the ER for cable television networks around the world such as Discovery Channel, TLC, Paramount Network, A&E, Travel Channel, The Weather Channel, National Geographic and Animal Planet.
The company is headquartered in Sherman Oaks, California and was founded in 1986 by Gary R. Benz and Michael Branton.
The company also distributes reality and documentary shows from third-party production companies internationally.

History
The company was founded in 1986 by Gary R. Benz and Michael Branton.

In 1997, the company formed GRB Home Entertainment to distribute the company's television programs for home video release and signed a distribution deal with Image Entertainment (the largest distributor of LaserDiscs, now known as RLJE Films) on March 3, 1998.

On May 13, 1999, German publishing company Axel Springer SE acquired   51% majority stake in the company, but was later divested in 2002.

In May 2012, the company established a film division.

Television programs

Television films, miniseries and specials
 The Ultimate Stuntman: A Tribute to Dar Robinson (1987)
 The World's Greatest Stunts (1988)
 Live! The World's Greatest Stunts (1990) 
 Masters of Illusion: The Wizards of Special Effects (1994)
 Aliens Invade Hollywood (1997)
 Medal of Honor (1999)
 War Dogs (1999)
 Climb Against the Odds (1999)
 On the Inside: The Real Ghosthunters (1999)
 Rangers: Cops in the Woods (2000)
 Stuntmen's World Tour (2000)
 Terror in the Tracks (2001)
 Extreme Driving Quiz (2001)
 In Pursuit of the Wild (2001)
 Highway Pirates (2001)
 Stigmata: Divine Blood (2001)
 Bet Your Life (2004)
 True Caribbean Pirates (2006)

References

External links
 
American companies established in 1986
Entertainment companies established in 1986
Mass media companies established in 1986
Companies based in Los Angeles County, California
Television production companies of the United States
Film production companies of the United States
1986 establishments in California
Entertainment companies based in California
Axel Springer SE